Josephine “Jo” Brooke Wilson (previously Karev), formerly Brooke Stadler, M.D., F.A.C.S. is a character from the medical drama television series Grey's Anatomy, which airs on the American Broadcasting Company (ABC) in the United States.

The character was created by series producer Shonda Rhimes and is portrayed by actor Camilla Luddington. She was introduced in the ninth season premiere episode "Going, Going, Gone" as a surgical intern at Seattle Grace Mercy West Hospital, later renamed Grey Sloan Memorial in the same season. Luddington's character was conceptualized as the new love interest for Justin Chambers' character, Alex Karev.

In the storyline, Jo befriends Alex, bonding over their similarly troubled childhoods, which soon blossoms into a relationship and later marriage. The character's abandonment issues and story as a domestic abuse survivor have been focal points in storylines. Other storylines include her mental health struggles, especially after learning she is a product of rape and when her mother refuses to accept her. Jo, whose real name is later revealed to be Brooke, is estranged from her abusive husband Paul Stadler and ran away to Seattle to start a new life. The character's contribution to strong, subject-sensitive storylines has received praise from fans and critics alike.

Storylines
In the ninth season, Jo is an intern who clashes with Alex. At Bailey's wedding, they eventually form a bond over their similar childhoods. As the season develops, their friendship enhances as Alex develops feelings for Jo. In the episode, “Love Turns You Upside Down”, after assaulting a parent for attempting to abandon her baby, Jo reveals to Alex she was left at a fire station when she was two weeks old. She got bumped around foster families until she started living in her car when she was 16. Ms. Schmidt, a high school teacher, is the only one who ever cared about her. She tells him that she went to good schools because she worked hard for it, and that Ms. Schmidt was the only person there for her at her graduation. Ms. Schmidt was also the one who gave her the watch when she got the job at the hospital. Alex sits down next to her, and compliments the watch.

In the penultimate episode of season nine, “Readiness is All”, Jo gets into an altercation with her boyfriend Jason. She reveals he beat her, and she fought off Jason when he grabbed her and then he hit his head on the fireplace. Alex convinces Jason not to press charges. In the finale episode “Perfect Storm”, Alex confesses his feelings to Jo and they kiss. In the tenth season, Jo is now a resident and in a relationship with Alex. In the eleventh season, Jo is frustrated with Meredith growing closer to Alex, in the wake of Cristina's departure, feeling like a second choice. In the twelfth-season episode "I Choose You", Jo finds an invoice from the fertility clinic that housed Izzie and Alex's fertilized embryos from when she had cancer, and ponders the possibility that he has "a bunch of Izzie babies". She questions whether she is just the “let's get a dog girl” and whether what they have is real, and Alex reassures her that his relationship with Izzie was in the past and that he would have a baby with her. Alex proposes in "Things We Lost in the Fire", but Jo is seemingly frustrated from the execution, as she was flustered from Alex always choosing Meredith over her. In the twelfth-season finale "Family Affair", Alex and Jo break up, as Jo rejects his proposal again. A drunken Jo admits to Andrew DeLuca that she is already married and estranged from her abusive husband, having run away from him to Seattle, and that is why she cannot marry Alex. Alex walks in on a drunken Jo pulling DeLuca down on her bed, but Alex misinterprets it as DeLuca sexually assaulting her, so beats him near to death.

In the thirteenth-season episode "You Haven't Done Nothin'", Jo tells Alex the day before his trial with DeLuca that she is already married. Alex is baffled by why she never told him, and Jo says she worried he would try to attack her husband and wind up in jail. She says she might leave, as her testimony will be a matter of record, revealing her location. "True Colors" reveals Jo's real name is Brooke and her husband is Paul Stadler. In the fourteenth-season premiere, Alex emphasizes to Jo that he would never hurt her, and he is not like Paul or Jason. The two reconcile. In "1-800-799-7233", Jo has been found by her husband with a new fiancé, Jenny. Jo recognizes Jenny is in an abusive relationship and tries to convince her to turn against Paul. Later, Paul becomes a victim of a hit-and-run. In "Personal Jesus", Paul tries to get released from the hospital, but Jenny has turned to Jo's side and reveals she will testify against him. Paul gets mad and tries to attack her, but hits his head on the bed frame and then the floor, causing second-impact syndrome, which leads to his brain swelling. He is pronounced brain dead and, wanting something good to come from it, Jo decided to donate his organs for transplant. Jo and Alex have their wedding in "All of Me".

In the fifteenth season, Jo is now a general surgical fellow. In "Silent All These Years", Jo tracks down her birth mother, Vicki Rudin, who is married with two kids, and discovers she is a product of rape. She spirals into a deep depression. In the finale "Jump into the Fog", Jo voluntarily checks into the psych ward. In the sixteenth season, Jo emerges from the psych ward, and she and Alex get legally married, after finding out they never signed a marriage license. She also becomes an attending. After "My Shot", Alex tells Jo he has gone to his mother's. In "Leave a Light On", after months of Alex's disappearance and Jo's concerns and suspicions he has left her, he reveals through a letter that Izzie did indeed have his kids via the frozen embryos and he has left to be a father to their twins and to start a new life with her. Alex leaves her his shares at Grey Sloan and says she deserves better, but wants to give his kids the life she and he never had. In "Life on Mars?", Jo declares she will rise so high that she will make Alex look like a fool for having left her, and admits she cannot hate Alex because of how much he loved her.

In the seventeenth season, Jo begins a friends-with-benefits relationship with Jackson, though that ends quickly when Jackson decides to leave the hospital and move to Boston. At the same time, Jo treats a premature baby named Luna, who lost her mother in childbirth. As Jo becomes more attached to Luna, she decides to switch specialties from general to OB-GYN. Jo eventually decides to legally apply to adopt Luna, but her application is turned down after she fails her background check. Jo is still determined to become Luna's mother and after she gets Link to temporarily foster Luna, she finally is granted full custody and she moves in a new apartment with her to start a new life.

Development
In August 2012, it was announced that Camilla Luddington, Gaius Charles, and Tina Majorino had been cast as Jo Wilson, Shane Ross, and Heather Brooks, respectively; these characters would be the new interns of Seattle Grace-Mercy West. TVGuide later reported that even with all of the recurring cast being added to Grey's Anatomy for the new season that True Blood star Camilla Luddington is the only actress with an option to become a series regular.

Luddington had met Rhimes a few months before the auditioning process for Jo and missed the actual audition due to a scheduling conflict. “[She] had a pilot called Gilded Lilys that I tested for, so I knew [her] a few months before,” the actress explained, according to TVLine. “When I went in [for Grey's], I actually missed the auditions because I was at Comic-Con for Tomb Raider. I heard that Shonda had wanted me to come in, but I couldn't make it.” The casting directors, however, did not find the girl they were looking for in that period of time. “That Monday, they said they still hadn't found anybody,” Luddington said, sharing that she was then given the chance to try out for the part. She revealed that the hiring process for the medical drama was fast. “I went in, and my first scene was kind of flirty,” she shared. “My second scene was me just blabbering a lot of medical dialogue. I probably heard two days later that I got the role.”

Luddington said, “They had told me they were going to write our stories just off our personalities, so I guess I come across as a garbage eater or something,” she said with a laugh, referring to her character's street smarts. “They had decided after they cast me that I would be Karev's new love interest. It was interesting. I had never been cast that way before.” She later revealed that they cut her first scene with Meredith Grey, portrayed by Ellen Pompeo as she had forgotten her lines of elaborate medical dialogue, due to being nervous and having already been a fan of the show. She believed that her role would be cut by the end of the day, but it was only the scene.

Characterization and development
Luddington describes Jo as having "navigated through her life always looking over her shoulder" due to her estranged abusive husband. Krista Vernoff described the character as "resilient".

Regarding the domestic abuse episode, Luddington shed light on Ellen Pompeo's leading character Meredith Grey supporting her, despite their disparities as colleagues in the past. 
 "That played out amazing. The moment where Jo is watching Paul manipulate people and he is so charming and confident and suggesting that Jo, in her past, had not been believed? He finds subtle ways to undermine her — saying that she was a party girl and alcoholic. In that moment when Jo runs out from the gallery and interrupts them, she didn't believe Meredith would believe her. They had a rocky relationship in the past. But it was this incredible moment for Jo when Meredith turns around and tells her, "I know who you are." That's when Jo breaks down because I don't know how often — if ever — she's heard that."

In an interview with Bustle, Luddington noted her character's domestic abuse storyline being in connection to the #MeToo and Time's Up movements going viral. She described it as a story of women "no longer being silent, and women finding the strength to use their voice and to be heard and to be believed". While the storyline was already in development for over a season and the headlines for the movements going viral only occurred when they were in the midst of filming the episodes, Luddington found the coincidence serendipitous.

The character's reunion with her abusive husband, portrayed by Matthew Morrison showcases the illusion created by domestic abusers. Showrunner Krista Vernoff commented on the particular casting choice of Morrison, known for more charming roles on Glee as being perfect for the character to hoodwink others who are not the victim of the perpetrator's violence; Luddington noted her character being "paralyzed" when confronted by her estranged ex-partner and the "manipulative" nature of Morrison's character, to all those around him.

In the wake of Justin Chambers' abrupt departure from the series, Vernoff spoke on her choice to divorce Jo and Alex. She felt that it would have been a disservice to Luddington to explore more layered and dynamic storylines in the future saying, “It wasn't fair to her to keep her married to a character who was off screen,” Vernoff says. “It would absolutely eliminate [the chance for her to play] so many colors that she is so good at playing” and finally evaluated as a result that it “...wasn't even a debate in the writers room,” adding that giving Alex a happy ending with Izzie “was so clearly the right course.

Vernoff later commented on the decision to not further explore Jo's depression in the wake of Alex leaving her. She assessed, “[Camilla] had so beautifully gone through many months of very dark storytelling, and I didn't want any of us to watch Jo go into a hole again.” Vernoff also said Jo's reaction made the most sense “because [of] the experience [...] not knowing [can be] so much worse than a very painful truth. Jo had so many episodes of not knowing [where Alex was] that even though the [eventual] answer was horridly painful, there was really honest relief [in just knowing what was up]. Getting an answer finally allowed her to strangely feel better than she had when she was just in the dark. [She] had imagined every possible worst-case scenario. And even though one of them came true, just having the information allowed her to move on. It felt like she had done a lot of grieving for the relationship in the weeks prior to receiving that letter.”

Reception

Critical reception
Writing about the twelfth season episode "I Choose You", Lauren Hoffman stated she enjoyed Jo's scenes with Alex, but found her response to the discovery of Alex and Izzie's embryos "really confusing". She found the character jumped to a false conclusion after Alex stated he agreed to fertilize the eggs a long time ago. She felt Jo would be "pragmatic enough" to "understand the big picture here" and expressed criticism of her being "absently upset with him until the end of the episode".

For the domestic abuse episode "1-800-799-7233", Ariana Romero of Refinery29 singled out Luddington's “intensely evocative performance without saying a word” when her character is confronted by her estranged ex-partner. Furthermore, Romero praised the camerawork in identifying the viewer in the shoes of a domestic abuse survivor, noting how it centers on her “bewildered, horrified, and shocked face as Paul's voice sounds far away, like she's hearing it through a seashell”. In another piece of commentary, she spoke of the gaslighting that her abusive partner uses, as Stadler's first remark is saying Brooke looks “better” and that “It looks like you finally got the help you needed.”

Jo's development and the sensitive subject matter of sexual assault in “Silent All These Years” was well remarked and acclaimed. Digital Spy, in a review nine months later called it a “highly emotional episode for Jo”. The storylines in the episode were described as “emotional, powerful, and, I hope, educational” by Abby Gardner of Glamour. Amanda Bell of TV Guide called the scenes involving Jo and her mother, portrayed by Michelle Forbes were described as “unspeakably upsetting” and the revelation of her conception as ”earth-shattering”.

Maggie Fremont for Vulture commented negatively on the character in the wake of Alex's departure episode saying, "Poor Jo! And poor me for having to sympathize with a character I can't stand, you know? Jo's letter truly sucks", commenting on the impersonal nature of the letter." Jasmine Blu for TV Fanatic similarly was critical of the character saying, "Woe is Joe hours [...] irritating" and that "so much of Alex's storylines in the last few seasons have been playing second to Jo."

References 

Grey's Anatomy characters
Television characters introduced in 2012
Fictional offspring of rape
Fictional homeless people
Fictional surgeons
Fictional female doctors
Female characters in television